Carbon Recycling International (CRI) is an Icelandic limited liability company which has developed a technology designed to produce renewable methanol from carbon dioxide and hydrogen, using water electrolysis or, alternatively, hydrogen captured from industrial waste gases. The technology is  trademarked by CRI as Emissions-to-Liquids (ETL) and the renewable methanol produced by CRI is trademarked as Vulcanol. In 2011 CRI became the first company to produce and sell liquid renewable transport fuel produced using only carbon dioxide, water and electricity from renewable sources.

History
CRI, incorporated in 2006, was founded by Fridrik Jonsson, Art Shulenberger, Oddur Ingolfsson, and KC Tran. In addition to Icelandic individuals and funds, investors include Canadian multinational methanol supplier and distributor Methanex and Chinese multinational automotive manufacturing company Geely.

CRI's first commercial scale plant, the George Olah Plant (named after George Andrew Olah, the 1994 Nobel Prize Laureate in chemistry), was completed in 2011. CRI is currently working on several new projects in parallel, including in an EU Horizon 2020 research programme funded MefCO2 consortium to build a renewable methanol demonstration plant in Germany and in the FreSME consortium to build a renewable methanol demonstration plant in Sweden.

Renewable methanol
Renewable methanol can be used as a fuel, chemical feedstock (including various types of fuels) or blended with gasoline. Fuels which are produced partially or fully from methanol include biodiesel, dimethyl ether or oxymethylene ether, as well as synthetic gasoline from the Mobil methanol-to-gasoline (MTG) process. Gasoline blends range from 3% methanol, which is allowed in European standard gasoline, to 56% methanol, a blend for flexible fuel vehicles which has the same energy density and oxygen content as E85 gasoline. CRI has run fleet tests with a range of lower blends and higher blend options in cars from different manufacturers, including 100% methanol in special flexible fuel vehicles manufactured by Geely. Renewable methanol is compatible with internal combustion engines as well as methanol fuel cells. Internal combustion engines that operate on 100% methanol are in production both for light vehicles, trucks and ships. Methanol fuel cells of varying energy density are available from multiple manufacturers in North America, Europe and Asia.

Production

Production of renewable methanol does not depend on agricultural resources, as hydrogen and carbon dioxide are the primary inputs. CRI's emissions-to-liquids production process is based on three main modules, carbon dioxide purification, hydrogen generation and the methanol synthesis and purification system. The catalytic conversion process from hydrogen and carbon dioxide occurs in one step, while production of methanol from fossil fuels, such as natural gas or coal, involves several reforming steps to obtain syngas followed by the catalytic step. Unlike some other power-to-fuel technologies, which use carbon dioxide and hydrogen as inputs, CRI's emissions-to-liquids process also does not require the carbon dioxide to be 'shifted' prior to the synthesis step.

Plants
The George Olah Plant, or the GO Plant, has a name-plate capacity of 5 million liters per year. It is located close to the Blue Lagoon spa facility and HS Orka's Svartsengi power station. The plant can capture and utilize around 10% of the carbon dioxide emitted by the Svartsengi power station.

Legislation
The European Union's renewable energy directive recognizes renewable methanol as a renewable transport fuel from non-biological sources, which means that it can be used as an advanced renewable transport fuel under the EU's renewable fuel blending mandates.

Impact
Carbon dioxide is a major cause of global warming. By removing carbon dioxide from industrial emissions and increasing the availability of energy derived from electricity or low-carbon intensity hydrogen, CRI's process helps to mitigate climate change. Renewable methanol burns cleanly as a fuel and substituting renewable methanol for gasoline and diesel fuels reduces urban emissions of particulate matter, sulphur oxides (SOx) and nitrous oxides (NOx).

CRI's process can also be used to store energy in the form of methanol, especially in cases where the energy source is intermittent. For example, wind and solar power are intermittently  available. By storing energy from these sources in liquid chemical form, the generation of electricity and utilization of electricity does not have to be linked in time and space.. Methanol is also a good energy carrier. As a liquid fuel it is easier and cheaper to store and transport than gaseous fuels such as hydrogen or methane.

Future projects
CRI plans to implement standardized CSPs (commercial scale plants), each with a capacity of at least 50,000 tons of methanol production per year.

See also

 Methanol economy

References

External links
 Methanol Institute

Energy companies of Iceland
Renewable energy in Iceland
Renewable fuels
Companies based in Reykjavík
Renewable resource companies established in 2006
2006 establishments in Iceland